Ryan Daniel Silverfield (born August 4, 1980) is an American football coach who is the head football coach at the University of Memphis. Silverfield has spent most of his coaching career, which began during his senior year of high school, as either a line coach or a member of the offensive staff. He was hired at Memphis by then-head coach Mike Norvell prior to the 2016 season. After Norvell's departure to Florida State on December 8, 2019, Silverfield served as the interim head coach before being promoted to head coach on December 28, 2019.

Playing career
Silverfield played for The Bolles School for four years, winning state championships in 1995 and 1998. He then joined the coaching staff as an assistant for the 1999 season, ending his playing career. Silverfield is therefore notable as one of the only coaches in the FBS ranks to have never played college football.

Coaching career
Silverfield landed his first college coaching job during his freshman year at Hampden–Sydney College; he opted to coach for his four years in college rather than play. He served as an offensive assistant for one year, then as the defensive line coach for his sophomore and junior years, and as the tight ends coach for his senior year. For the 2004 season, he served as the head coach at Memorial Day High School in Savannah, Georgia, whom he led to a 1–9 record. He then rejoined the college coaching ranks, as he served as the quarterbacks coach at Jacksonville University for one year and a graduate assistant at UCF for two, before joining the Minnesota Vikings staff, where he remained for six years in various positions. Following a one year stint at Toledo, he took a position as an offensive analyst at Arizona State, though he left part of the way through the season to join the Detroit Lions staff as an offensive line coach. 

After the conclusion of the 2015 season, he was hired at Memphis by Mike Norvell as an assistant. He remained in that position for two years before being tapped as the offensive line coach and run game coordinator in 2018. He was elevated to assistant head coach in 2019, and was named interim head coach when Norvell left to take the head coach position at Florida State. On December 13, Silverfield was promoted to head coach and debuted in his first college game as head coach on December 28 against Penn State in the 2019 Cotton Bowl Classic.

Personal life
Silverfield is married to his wife, Mariana. The two have a dog, Max.

Head coaching record

High school

College

References

External links
 Memphis profile

1980 births
Living people
Arizona State Sun Devils football coaches
Detroit Lions coaches
Hampden–Sydney College alumni
Hampden–Sydney Tigers football coaches
Jacksonville Dolphins football coaches
Memphis Tigers football coaches
Minnesota Vikings coaches
Toledo Rockets football coaches
UCF Knights football coaches
High school football coaches in Florida
High school football coaches in Georgia (U.S. state)